Adelais is a given name that may refer to:

Adelaide of Auxerre, a name referring to multiple people and sometimes given as Adelais
Audelais of Benevento, name sometimes given as Adelais (lived 730s)
Adelais, daughter of Pepin the Short (d.768), died in childhood
Adelaide of Lombardy, name sometimes given as Adelais, wife of Lambert I of Nantes (d.836)
Adelais of Amboise, wife of Ingelger (d.888)
Adelais of Vermandois, spouse of Charles, Duke of Lower Lorraine (d. after 935)
Adelaide-Blanche of Anjou, (c. 940–1026) name also given as Adelais
Adelais, wife of Ermengol of Rouergue (b.955-d.993)
Adelaide of Susa (d.1091), name also given as Adelais
Adelais de Roquefeuil (married 1129)
Adelais, wife of William II, Count of Nevers (d.1148)
Adelais, Lady of Venisy (d. 1221)
 Adeliza of Louvain, (d. 1151), sometimes Adelais

See also
Adel (name)
Adelaide (given name)
Adele (given name)
Alice (given name)